(Hungarian for "Long live the Magyar!"), Op. 332, is a polka composed by Johann Strauss II. It was first performed at the Redoutensaal building in Pest in March 1869, two years after the Austro-Hungarian Compromise of 1867. The work was dedicated "to the Hungarian Nation". The coda of the work features a fleeting quotation from the Rákóczi March, which Hector Berlioz had earlier utilised in his La damnation de Faust.

References

External links
; Det Norske Kammerorkester, conductor 

Compositions by Johann Strauss II
Polkas
1869 compositions
Music dedicated to causes or groups
Hungarian words and phrases